Educating Greater Manchester 2 is the 6th series of the BAFTA award-winning British documentary television programme Educating broadcast on Channel 4. The documentary follows previous installments in the Educating... series including the BAFTA Award-winning Educating Essex (2011), Educating Yorkshire (2013), Educating the East End (2014), Educating Cardiff (2015) and Educating Greater Manchester (2017).

Channel 4 confirmed in January 2018 that the Educating programme was renewed for two further series. For the first time, the series would have returned to the same school for the sixth and seventh series, in Salford, after the fifth series was filmed at Harrop Fold School in Little Hulton, Salford. However, over the course of filming the sixth series, headmaster Drew Povey resigned as a result of allegations of off-rolling students, forcing Harrop Fold School to be placed in special measures by Ofsted. Channel 4 later confirmed that these episodes would not be aired as a result of the findings. However, the episodes began airing from 3 November 2020.

Episodes

Production
It was announced on 24 January 2018 that there would be a series 2 and series 3 of Educating Greater Manchester. In the wake of the off-rolling scandal and the investigation into the conduct of Drew Povey and Ross Povey, it was later announced these episodes would not be aired after the pair both resigned from their posts as the investigation continued. Following on from the resignation the school inspectors Ofsted deemed the school to be failing in their safeguarding duty due to the leadership of Drew Povey and the school was placed into special measures. The school was deemed safe after a new interim Headteacher took charge of the failing school.

Channel 4 decided to start airing the second series from 3 November 2020.

References

External links
 

2017 British television seasons
2010s British documentary television series
Channel 4 documentary series
English-language television shows
British high school television series
Television series about educators
Television series about teenagers
Television shows set in Greater Manchester